The 3rd Polish Fighter Wing was a mainly Polish formation of the Royal Air Force during the Second World War, that flew Supermarine Spitfires. It was part of the Polish Air Forces in France and Great Britain.

It was formed in June 1943, as the 2nd Polish Fighter Wing, from two Polish squadrons, the No. 302 Polish Fighter Squadron and No. 317 Polish Fighter Squadron. In September it was merged into the 1st Polish Fighter Wing (which was soon thereafter renamed the 131 Wing). It was reorganized in February 1944.

Its composition would not be stable, as Polish Squadrons were frequently exchanged between three Polish wings (the No. 131 Wing RAF (1st Polish) wing, the No. 133 Wing RAF  (2nd Polish) wing, and the 3rd Polish Fighter Wing).

At various times, this wing included other Polish squadrons, such as the No. 303 Squadron RAF and No. 316 Polish Fighter Squadron. The number of wings was also not constant, as it varied from at one to two.

References 

Polish 03
Fighter wings
Military units and formations established in 1943
Military units and formations disestablished in 1946
Poland–United Kingdom military relations